The 2010 European Under-21 Baseball Championship is an international baseball competition held in Brno, Czech Republic from August 17 to 22, 2010. It features teams from Czech Republic, France, Italy, Russia, Slovakia and Ukraine.

Round 1

Standings

Schedule

Finals

Final Game

External links
Game Results

References

European Under-21 Baseball Championship
European Under-21 Baseball Championship
International baseball competitions hosted by the Czech Republic
2010 in Czech sport